LinkSpace or Link Space Aerospace Technology Inc. is a Chinese private space launch company based in Beijing. It is led by CEO Hu Zhenyu, and founded as the first private rocket firm in China. The company was founded in 2014, by Hu Zhenyu, a graduate of South China University of Technology; Yan Chengyi, a graduate of Tsinghua University; and Wu Xiaofei, a manufacturing expert. The company is registered in Shenzhen.

Rockets

Test rockets
In 2013, before the official registration of the company, Hu's team was testing the KC-SA-TOP suborbital rocket with  payloads in Horqin Left Rear Banner, Inner Mongolia Autonomous Region.

VTVL prototypes
LinkSpace has built flying vertical-takeoff/vertical-landing (VTVL) prototype test rockets, to develop its reusable rocket technology. By July 2016, it achieved hover flight with a single-engine thrust-vectored rocket. By September 2017, it had built three hovering rockets, tested in Shandong Province.

On 19 April 2019, the VTVL prototype test rocket RLV-T5 flew to a height of 40 m (131 ft) and landed safely after thirty seconds of flight. RLV-T5, also known as NewLine Baby, is 8.1 m (27 ft) in length, weighs 1.5 t (1,100 lbs) and has five liquid engines.

On 10 August 2019 the company reported a test flight reaching a height of 300 meters.

On 5 May 2022, the company announced that it had conducted a static fire test of its RLV-T6 test vehicle in preparation for a  altitude test flight in late 2022, but in September it was expected to be launched no earlier than mid-2023. The rocket will launch from Lenghu, in Qinghai Province.

New Line 1
The New Line 1 (Xin Gan Xian 1) is a two-stage rocket under development to launch microsats and nanosats, with a reusable first stage.

The first stage would have four liquid engines, fueled by kerolox (liquid oxygen and kerosene), each producing  of thrust. It is projected to have an initial launch cost of $4.5 million, dropping to $2.25 million using a reused first stage. As of the end of 2017, the main rocket engine has been tested over 200 times, and first launch was planned for 2020.

Future New Line rockets
Future development of a reusable second stage, in addition to the reusable first stage, is anticipated for in a future vehicle, such as New Line 3.

Services
LinkSpace is planning to also be a transport and rocket services company, providing rocket parts, and transportation. As part of the transportation, it will not just send payloads into orbit, or on suborbital jaunts; it also plans to send packages from one point on Earth to another point. This is similar to SpaceX's plan for suborbital rocket passenger transport anywhere around the world with Starship.

Marketplace
LinkSpace is in competition with several other Chinese space rocket startups, being LandSpace, Galactic Energy, ExPace, i-Space, OneSpace and Deep Blue Aerospace. With rocket reusability and point-to-point transport, it is similar to SpaceX.

See also
 ExPace
 LandSpace
 OneSpace
 Galactic Energy
 Deep Blue Aerospace, another Chinese company which is testing VTVL technology

References

External links
 Official website: http://linkspace.com.cn/

Commercial launch service providers
Transport companies established in 2014
Chinese companies established in 2014
Aerospace companies of China
Companies based in Beijing